Aaron Ford may refer to:

 Aaron L. Ford (1903–1983), U.S. Representative from Mississippi
 Aaron D. Ford (born 1972), Nevada Attorney General 
 Aaron Ford, former drummer with ...And You Will Know Us by the Trail of Dead